Robert G. Jordan (April 1, 1923 – September 10, 1965) was an American actor, most notable for being a member of the Dead End Kids, the East Side Kids, and The Bowery Boys.

Early life and career
Jordan was born in Harrison, New York, At the age of four, he was working in an early movie version of A Christmas Carol. His mother took him to talent shows in and around Harrison, New York. He also modeled for newspaper and magazine advertisements and appeared in short films and radio programs. In the late 1920s, his family moved to the upper west side of Manhattan. In 1929, he was cast as Charles Hildebrand in the 1929 Broadway play Street Scene.

Dead End Kids and East Side Kids
Though he was the youngest, Jordan was the first of the boys who made up the Dead End Kids to work in films with a role in a 1933 Universal short. In 1935, he became one of the original Dead End Kids by winning the role of Angel in Sydney Kingsley's Broadway drama Dead End about life in the slums of the east side of New York City. The play was performed at the Belasco Theatre and ran for three years with over 600 performances. He appeared for the first season and the beginning of the second but left in mid-November 1936. He returned in time to join the others in 1937 in Hollywood, California to make the movie version of the play, starring big names such as Humphrey Bogart, Joel McCrea, Sylvia Sidney, and Claire Trevor.

Following the making of Dead End, Jordan found himself "released" from his contract at Goldwyn, and subsequently, he appeared at Warner Brothers with the rest of the Dead End Kids. After one year, Warners released most of them, but kept Leo Gorcey and Jordan as solo performers. Jordan appeared (as Douglas Fairbanks Rosenbloom) in Warner's Damon Runyon comedy A Slight Case of Murder (1938) and at Metro-Goldwyn-Mayer in Young Tom Edison (1940).

In 1940, Jordan appeared in the movie Military Academy and accepted an offer from producer Sam Katzman to star in a new tough-kid series titled "The East Side Kids." Leo Gorcey soon joined him, then Huntz Hall, and the trio continued to lead the series until 1943 when Jordan entered the United States Army during World War II as a foot soldier in the 97th Infantry Division. He subsequently was involved in an elevator accident that forced him to have surgery to remove his right kneecap.

Later career and personal life
When Jordan returned to films in 1945, he found that his former gang-mates Gorcey and Hall were obtaining the lion's share of both the content and the salary for the new Bowery Boys film series. Dissatisfied with his background status, he left the series after eight entries, and made only a few films thereafter.

On July 1, 1957, Jordan played Bob Ford, the assailant of Jesse James, in the television series Tales of Wells Fargo. One of his later performances was in an episode of Bonanza titled "The Many Faces of Gideon Flinch", where he played one of Bullet Head Burke's  men.

In subsequent years, Jordan worked as a bartender, a bad choice for him considering his alcoholism. He worked to support his family as a door-to-door photograph salesman and as a roughneck for an oil driller.

In 1957, Jordan and his wife divorced, they had one son, Robert Jr.

Death
On August 25, 1965, Jordan entered the Veterans Hospital in Sawtelle, California, for treatment of cirrhosis of the liver. He died on September 10, 1965 at the age of 42. His former Dead End Kid and East Side Kid co-star Leo Gorcey once observed, "Bobby Jordan must not have had a guardian angel."

Filmography

Film (Partial)

 Kid Millions (1934) as Tourist (uncredited)
 Dead End (1937) as Angel
 A Slight Case of Murder (1938) as Douglas Fairbanks Rosenbloom
 Crime School (1938) as Lester "Squirt" Smith
 Reformatory (1938) as Pinky Leonard
 My Bill (1938) as Reginald Colbrook Jr.
 Angels with Dirty Faces (1938) as Swing
 They Made Me a Criminal (1939) as Angel
 Off the Record (1939) as Mickey Fallon
 Hell's Kitchen (1939) as Joey Richards
 The Angels Wash Their Faces (1939) as Bernie Smith
 Dust Be My Destiny (1939) as Jimmy Glenn
 On Dress Parade (1939) as Cadet Ronny Morgan
 Young Tom Edison (1940) as Joe "Joey" Doyle
 You're Not So Tough (1940) as Rap
 Boys of the City (1940) as Danny Dolan
 Military Academy (1940) as Dick Hill
 That Gang of Mine (1940) as Danny Dolan
 Give Us Wings (1940) as Rap
 Pride of the Bowery (1940) as Danny
 Flying Wild (1941) as Danny Dolan
 Bowery Blitzkrieg (1941) as Danny Breslin
 Spooks Run Wild (1941) as Danny
 Mr. Wise Guy (1942) as Danny Collins
 Let's Get Tough! (1942) as Danny Connors
 Smart Alecks (1942) as Danny Stevens
 Neath Brooklyn Bridge (1942) as Danny Lyons
 Junior Army (1942) as Jockey
 Kid Dynamite (1943) as Danny Lyons
 Keep 'Em Slugging (1943) as Tommy Banning
 Clancy Street Boys (1943) as Danny
 Ghosts on the Loose (1943) as Danny
 Destroyer (1943) as Sobbing Sailor (uncredited)
 Adventures of the Flying Cadets (1943, Serial) as Cadet "Jinx" Roberts
 Bowery Champs (1944) as Bobby Jordan
 Live Wires (1946) as Bobby
 In Fast Company (1946) as Bobby
 Bowery Bombshell (1946) as Bobby
 Spook Busters (1946) as Bobby
 Mr. Hex (1946) as Bobby
 The Beginning or the End (1947) as Radioman on Tinian Receiving A-Bomb Message (uncredited)
 Hard Boiled Mahoney (1947) as Bobby
 News Hounds (1947) as Bobby
 Bowery Buckaroos (1947) as Bobby
 Treasure of Monte Cristo (1949) as Tony Torecelli
 The Fat Man (1951) as Ted - Bellhop (uncredited)
 The Eddie Cantor Story (1953) as Customer (uncredited)
 The Man Is Armed (1956) as Thorne

Television

References

Further reading
 Dye, David. Child and Youth Actors: Filmography of Their Entire Careers, 1914-1985. Jefferson, NC: McFarland & Co., 1988, p. 120.
 Holmstrom, John. The Moving Picture Boy: An International Encyclopaedia from 1895 to 1995, Norwich, Michael Russell, 1996, p. 116.

External links

1923 births
1965 deaths
American male film actors
People from Harrison, New York
Deaths from cirrhosis
Male actors from Greater Los Angeles
20th-century American male actors
Alcohol-related deaths in California
United States Army personnel of World War II
United States Army soldiers